970 Park Avenue is a luxury residential housing cooperative in Manhattan, New York City.

970 was designed by the New York architectural firm of Schwartz & Gross and built by the developers Bing & Bing. It is located on Park Avenue and East 83rd Street.

The 12-story building was erected in 1912. In 1940, the bank that owned the building reconfigured the building, altering the original spacious apartments into smaller units. In 1987, it was converted to a cooperative by Martin J. Raynes; Raynes  added two triplex penthouses with "greenhouse" studies, circular staircases and large terraces.

References

Residential buildings completed in 1912
Condominiums and housing cooperatives in Manhattan
Park Avenue
Upper East Side
1912 establishments in New York City
Residential buildings in Manhattan